Faizabad castle is a historical castle located in Buin Zahra County in Qazvin Province, Iran. The longevity of this fortress dates back to the Historical periods after Islam.

References 

Castles in Iran